Jhelum District (Urdu and ), is partially in Pothohar Plateau, and partially in Punjab Plain of the Punjab province of Pakistan. Jhelum is one of the oldest districts of Punjab. It was established on 23 March 1849. According to the 1998 census, the district had a population of 936,957, of which 31.48% were urban. Jhelum District has a diverse population of 1,103,000 (2006). Jhelum is known for providing many soldiers to the British and later to the Pakistan armed forces due to which it is also known as 'city of soldiers' or 'land of martyrs and warriors'. The district of Jhelum stretches from the river Jhelum almost to the Indus. Salt is quarried at the Mayo mine in the Salt Range. There are two coal mines in the district from which the North-Western railway obtains parts of its supply. These are the only coal mines in Punjab province which are in working condition. The chief center of the salt trade is Pind Dadan Khan. The district is crossed by the main line of the North-Western railway and also traversed along the south by a branch line. It is located in the north of the Punjab province, Jhelum district is bordered by Sargodha and Mandi Bahauddin to its south, Khushab to its southwest, Jhelum River to its south and east, Gujrat to its east, Chakwal to its west, Mirpur to its northeast, and Rawalpindi to its north.

Administration

Tehsils
District is administratively divided into four tehsils
Jhelum
Sohawa
Pind Dadan Khan
Dina,

Union Councils
which are divided into 53 Union Councils.

History

Early history
The history of the district dates back to the Hindu mythological period of the Mahabharata. The epic represents the Salt Range as the refuge of the five Pandava brethren during the period of their exile, and every salient point in its scenery is connected with some legend of the national heroes. Modern research has fixed the site of the conflict between Alexander and Porus as within Jhelum district, though the exact spot at which the Macedonian king affected the passage of the Jhelum (or Hydaspes) has been hotly disputed. The Panhwars, Janjuas and Jats, who now hold the Salt Range and its northern plateau respectively, appear to have been the earliest inhabitants.

The Janjuas, who appear to represent the oldest breed of Punjab and who still inhabit a large tract in the east of the District; while the Awans and Ghakars who cluster in the western plain, are apparently later invaders, the Janjuas were the dominant race during the before and early Muslim era and they long continued to retain their independence until the time of Sikh invaders, both in Jhelum itself and in the neighboring District of Rawalpindi.

Sultanate era

In 997 CE, Sultan Mahmud Ghaznavi, took over the Ghaznavid dynasty empire established by his father, Sultan Sebuktegin, he conquered the Shahis in Kabul in 1005, and followed it by the conquests of northern Punjab region. The Delhi Sultanate and later Mughal Empire ruled the region. The Punjab region became predominantly Muslim due to missionary Sufi saints whose dargahs dot the landscape of Punjab region, which is also reflected in Jhelum.

British era
During British rule, Jhelum was a district of Rawalpindi Division, and was larger than the current district of Jhelum. On 1 April 1904, the tehsil of Talagang was detached from the District and incorporated with the new District of Attock. According to the Gazetteer of the Jhelum District of 1904, 88.7% of the population were Muslim.

The old Jhelum district (minus Talagang) covered an area of 2,813 square miles (7285 km2) and included Chakwal Tehsil – it was bordered by Shahpur and Attock to the west, and by Rawalpindi to the north – the Jhelum River separated it from Kashmir to the north-east and from Gujrat and Shahpur to the south-east and south.

Independence
The predominantly Muslim population supported under the leadership of Raja Ghazanfar Ali khan of PD Khan Muslim League and Partition of India. After the independence of Pakistan in 1947, the minority Hindus and Sikhs migrated to India while the Muslim refugees from India settled in the Jhelum District.

Since independence the agriculture and industry of Jhelum developed and forms part of the economy of Pakistan.

Topography

Jhelum City

The district capital, Jhelum City, is situated on the right and left bank of the Jhelum River, the left side of Jhelum is known as Sarai Alamgir and it also contains the Military College Jhelum (MCJ). The 16th-century Grand Trunk Road passes through the city. Jhelum city is near the site of the Battle of the Hydaspes between the armies of Alexander and Porus This battle took place a few miles downstream from the city center, along the river banks. Population of the Jhelum city (proper) is about 172,073 (2009) and it is the 35th largest city of Pakistan by population. A cantonment was built during the British rule, which has grown up into a strong Garrison, with an Infantry Division commanded by a Major General.

River Jhelum

The river Jhelum is navigable throughout the district, which forms the south-eastern portion of a rugged Himalayan spur, extending between the Indus and Jhelum to the borders of the Sind Sagar Doab. Its scenery is very picturesque, although not of so wild a character as the mountain region of Rawalpindi to the north, and is lighted up in places by smiling patches of the cultivated valley. The backbone of the district is formed by the Salt Range, a treble line of parallel hills running in three long forks from east to west throughout its whole breadth.

The range rises in precipices, broken by gorges, clothed with brushwood, and traversed by streams which are at first clear but become impregnated with the saline matter over which they pass. Between the line of hills lies a table-land, in which the small lake of Kallar Kahar nestles amongst the minor ridges. North of the Salt Range, the country extends upwards in an elevated plateau, diversified by a number of ravines and fissures, until it loses itself in tangled masses of Rawalpindi mountains. In this rugged tract, cultivation is rare and difficult, the soil being choked with saline matter. At the foot of the Salt Range, however, a small strip of level soil lies along the banks of the Jhelum and is dotted with prosperous villages.

The drainage of the district is determined by a low central watershed running north and south at right angles to the Salt Range. The waters of the western portion find their way into the Sohan, and finally into the Indus; those of the opposite slope collect themselves into small torrents and empty themselves into the Jhelum River.

Khewra Salt Mine

The Khewra Salt Mine (or Mayo Salt Mine) is located in Khewra, north of Pind Dadan Khan, an administrative subdivision of Jhelum District, which rises from the Indo-Gangetic Plain. It is Pakistan's largest and oldest salt mine and the world's second largest. It is a major tourist attraction, drawing up to 40,000 visitors a year. Its history dates back to its discovery by Alexander's troops in 320 BC, but it started trading in the Mughal era. The main tunnel at ground level was developed by Dr. H. Warth, a mining engineer, in 1872 during British rule. After independence, the Pakistan Mineral Development Corporation took over the mine, which still remains the largest source of salt in the country, producing more than 350,000 tons per annum of about 99% pure halite.

Estimates of the reserves of salt in the mine vary from 82 million tons to 600 million tons.

Tilla Jogian

Tilla Jogian is the highest peak in the Eastern Salt Range. At 975 meters (3200 ft) above sea level, it is about 25 km to the west of Jhelum City and 10 km west of the model village of Khukha. The view from the top of Tilla is highly rewarding. Rohtas Fort is located to the east of Tilla Jogian at a distance of about 7 km from Dina, a rapidly expanding town on the Grand Trunk Road.

Rohtas Fort

Rohtas Fort (Qila Rohtas) is a historical garrison fort located near the city of Jhelum. It was built by Raja Todar Mal, under the orders of the Afghan king Sher Shah Suri, to subdue the rebellious tribes of the northern Punjab region, in the 16th century. This fort is about 4 km in circumference. The Rohtas fort was built to crush the local Gakhar tribes of Potohar, who rebelled against the Sur dynasty after the Mughal emperor Humayun was ousted by the former.

It took eight years to build the fort, it was captured by Mughal emperor Humayun in 1555. Nader Shah, the Turkic ruler of Persia, Afghan ruler Ahmed Shah Abdali and the Maratha army also camped here during their respective campaigns in the Punjab region. Rohtas was also occasionally used for administrative purposes by Maharaja Ranjit Singh of the Sikh Empire, after he captured it in 1825.

Agriculture

The area is located on the eastern part of Potohar upland along with River Jhelum.

Agriculture in the District Jhelum depends mainly on rainfall. About three-fourths of this precipitation is received in monsoon season and the remaining one-fourth is received during the rest of the year. The irrigated area at present is limited but the emphasis on the construction of small dams is gradually increasing. Wheat remains the main crop.

In Tehsil P.D. Khan, salt is the predominant feature that is spoiling the rich agricultural land day by day. There is a long strip of very rich and virgin soil along the river which could be made a paradise of citrus plantation by drip irrigation if the local people are motivated and the Government of Punjab expressed some interest in it.

Sports

The main sports of the area are centred on agricultural pursuits and excellence and include bugdar (stone) lifting by young men. A localised version of kabaddi, bull races centered on a Persian water wheel at the villages of Kantrili, Nathwala, and Jada near the suburban town of Kala Gujran. Tent pegging also known as neza bazi which indicates the region's prowess during war and battle and hence the city has attributed the name of the land of martyrs and warriors. Zamir Jaffri Cricket Stadium near Suleiman Park is named after Zamir Jafri, a poet from Jhelum. Hockey is another sport that is common in Jhelum.

Flora and fauna

Vegetation of the forests of Jhelum Forest Division is dry, deciduous shrub type, phulai, Kahu (wild olive), and sanatha are the main species. The stocking, on the whole, is poor and the forests are open. Vegetation is poor on sandstone and red marl. The southern slopes are often devoid of vegetation while northwestern slopes carry good forests. The forests of Jhelum Forests Division are burdened with the right of grazing, browsing, and firewood. Under settlement out of total area  only  about (45%) are right free. The remaining 55% are open to grazing.

The fauna of the district is mostly indigenous restricted, like the vegetation, but similarly varied and interesting. The rugged and rough terrain, low rainfall, the scantly cover of vegetation, and the burning passions of the increasing number of hunters, all have their share in limiting the animal kingdom in the district. The river offers a better environment than elsewhere though the hills support more interesting wildlife. Urial (an animal from a deer family) and chinckara are spot aids while wild boar are found in the Salt Range. Wolves, foxes, and wild cats are also found. Hare is fairly common. Chikor grey and black partridge are also found in the parts of the district. Migratory ducks like teal pintail and mallard and some geese visit during winter.

Climate
The climate of the tract is extreme. In winter it is very cold and summer is very hot. The average rainfall varies from 48 to 69 m.m per annum which is much below the required quantity but in the rainy season, the water torrents flow from north to the river Jhelum at a very fast speed and cause damages to the crops, bridges, roads, and are responsible for the soil erosion in the District.

Over the years, global climate change has affected Jhelum as well as any other place on Earth and below comparison charts from Weatherbase show the difference in climate between 2008 and 2015:

Demographics
At the time of the 2017 census the district had a population of 1,222,403, of which 601,406 were males and 620,862 females. Rural population is 868,106 (71.02%) while the urban population is 354,297 (28.98%). The literacy rate was 78.98%.

Religion 
As per the 2017 census Muslims were the predominant religious group with 98.92% while Christians were 1.00% of the population.

Language 
At the time of the 2017 census, 86.54% of the population spoke Punjabi, 2.48% Pashto and 2.28% Urdu as their first language.

Development organizations
Rehmat Welfare Foundation Jhelum is a charity project working for poor and needy people of fifty-mile area including Jhelum which cannot afford the expenses of their daily life and very expensive general medical and kidney dialysis treatment.

Civil Society Human and Institutional Development Program (CHIP) is working in Sohawa Tehsil since 2004, with its field office in the area CHIP has successfully mobilized community people to get organize into Community Based Organizations, Community Citizen Boards and Women Organizations. Further, CHIP has duly built the capacity of these local entities to take new initiatives. These community-level organizations, in collaborative partnerships with CHIP, are working on several development projects. The main focus of these projects is to eliminate illiteracy from villages of Sohawa especially those where government education structure does not exist, make clean drinking water available, provide technical support to the local farmers, raise skill development opportunities for women, and include them in the decision-making process, aiding social inclusion, so as to better represent the communities they live in. The local community-level organizations developed by CHIP are making successful efforts in implementing development projects by deriving funds from local government bodies.

Universities, colleges and schools

 AIOU – Jhelum campus
 Air Foundation School System Junior Branch (Near Al-Bilal Hotel)
 Air Foundation School System, Jhelum (Boys & Girls)
 Al Islam Sharia College Ketchehry Road Jhelum
 Army Public School and College, Jhelum Cantt.
 Army Public School and College, Mangla Cantt
 Bahria Foundation College, GT Road, Jhelum
 Beaconhouse School System, G T Road, Jhelum
 Bukhari College of Science and Comm Jhelum
 Cambridge College, 10-A Civil Lines, Jhelum
 Cantonment Board CMB Model, Jhelum
 Dar-e-Arqam School Muhammadi Chowk, Jehlum
 Etekosoft Institute of Computer Sciences, Jhelum
 Farabi Foundation Elementary School for Boys Mangla Road Dina Jhelum.
 Farabi Foundation Elementary School for Girls Kalwantpur Dina Jhelum.
 Farabi Foundation High School for Boys Dina Jhelum.
 Farabi Foundation High School for Girls Dina Jhelum.
 Fatima Jinnah Post Graduate Girls College, Jhelum Cantt
 Fauji Foundation Degree College, PD Khan
 Fauji Foundation Model School & College, Jhelum Cantt.
 Federal Government College, Mangla Cantt
 Global College of English Language, Bilal Town Jhelum
 Government Al Bairuni Degree College, Pind Dadan Khan
 Government College for Women, Jhelum
 Government College of Commerce, Bilal Town, Jhelum
 Government College of Education, Jhelum
 Government College of Technology, Chak Daulat
 Government College of technology, Chak Daulat, Jhelum
 Government College. G.T. Road, Jhelum
 Government Degree College for Women, Sanghoi
 Government Degree College, Dina
 Government Degree College, Jhelum
 Government Degree College, Sohawa
 Government Girls College, Jalalpur Sharif
 Government Institute of Commerce (W), Sohawa
 Government Institute of Commerce, Pind Dadan Khan
 Government Model High School Madu Kalas
 Government Model High School Ratwal, Pind Dadan Khan
 Government Model High School, Bair Faqiran
 Government Noor Mudrassa Tul Banat Girls School, established since 1944
 Government Post Graduate College, Jhelum
 Government Tabligh ul Islam secondary school, Jhelum
 International Islamic University Islamabad Schools, Jhelum
 Jhelum College of Education, Jhelum
 Jhelum Homeopathic Medical College, GT Road, Jada
 Jinnah College of Commerce & Computer Science, Jhelum
 Jinnah College of Commerce, Dina
 Jinnah Law College, Jhelum
 Litra Valley Girls College, Jango
 Lyceumhouse School System Karimpur Road, Jhelum.
 PICS, Bilal town
 Presentation Convent School, Jhelum
 Punjab College, PD Khan
 Punjab College, G.T Road, Jhelum
 QMA Jinnah College, PD Khan
 Research Girls College, Kala Gujran
 SLS College Jhelum
 Superior College, Jhelum
 The Educator School, G.T Road, Jada
 University of the Punjab, Jhelum campus
 VU Jhelum Campus
 Wings College of Commerce, 4-Civil Lines, Jhelum
 World Over School and College Academy, Jhelum

Notable people 

 Maj. Muhammad Akram, Nishan-e-Haider
 Jagjit Singh Aurora, commander Eastern Theatre, Indian Army in Indo-Pak War of 1971
 Fawad Chaudhry, Pakistani politician
 Sunil Dutt, Indian actor and politician
 Gulzar, Indian filmmaker, lyricist and poet
 Chaudhry Altaf Hussain, ex-governor Punjab
 Dr. Ghulam Hussain
 Zamir Jafri, poet
 Asif Nawaz Janjua, general and ex-chief of the Army Staff, Pakistan
 Ghazanfar Ali Khan, leader of the Pakistan Movement 
 Engineer Muhammad Ali Mirza, Islamic Scholar
 Porus the Elder – king, ancient warrior

See also
 Gharmala
 Dhanyala
 Noor Pur Baghan
 Shamaspur
 Chak Jamal
 Chak Khasa
 Dhok Masyal

References

External links

 Jhelum District Official Portal
 Jhelum Police Website
 TMA Jhelum Website
 Unofficial Jhelum Website
 Jhelum Networks Official Website

 
Districts of Punjab, Pakistan